The Deutschlandsender III was a 500 kilowatt longwave transmitter, erected in 1938/39 near Herzberg, Brandenburg in Germany.

Construction

Because the mast was under high voltage during transmission, the aircraft warning lighting was realized in a very unconventional manner. On small poles near the mast multiple rotating searchlights were mounted which illuminated the lens-like structure on the top.

It was planned to expand the facility to a circle group antenna. This antenna could not be completed as a result of the war.

On 21 April 1945 the transmitter was severely damaged by Allied bombing. The mast remained unimpaired, but it was dismantled by the Soviet occupation troops, a task that lasted from July 1946 to 23 December 1947. The other parts of the facility were dismantled in 1959, when waterworks were built on the former station area. Nevertheless, there are still some remnants of the base visible at the location.

It is unknown what happened to the mast after it was dismantled. It is sometimes claimed that it was rebuilt in the Ukraine, as "Kiev" was scrawled on the containers the components were transported in.

See also
 List of masts

External links
 
 http://www.skyscraperpage.com/diagrams/?b45271

Former radio masts and towers
Radio masts and towers in Germany
Buildings and structures in Elbe-Elster
Demolished buildings and structures in Germany
History of telecommunications in Germany
Towers completed in 1939
Lost objects
Elbe-Elster Land
1939 establishments in Germany